Frøya may refer to:

Places
Frøya, Sogn og Fjordane, an island in the municipality of Bremanger in Vestlandet, Norway
Frøya, Trøndelag, a municipality in Trøndelag, Norway
Frøya (island), an island in the municipality of Frøya in Trøndelag, Norway
Frøya Tunnel, an undersea tunnel connecting the municipalities of Frøya and Hitra in Trøndelag, Norway
Frøya Church, a church in Bremanger municipality in Norway

Sports
Frøya Ambassadors, a Norwegian basketball team
Frøya FK, a Norwegian association football club from Frøya, Trøndelag
Frøya official football team, the official association football team of Frøya in Trøndelag, Norway

Other
HNoMS Frøya, a minelayer ship in the Norwegian Navy
Frøya or Freyja, a Norse goddess